Amit Krishan Luthra (born 15 September 1960) is an Indian golfer, who led his country's team for over 20 years.

Luthra represented India in the 1982 Asian Games, where he was on the gold medal team. He is also an Arjuna Awardee, and recently won the Golf Championship at Pehelgam.

Background and family 
Luthra was born in New Delhi, India. His father was an avid golfer who served in the Indian Air Force. Luthra started playing golf at a very young age in Kanpur with his father and siblings where there was access to golf courses.

The Golf Foundation 
Luthra founded and runs The Golf Foundation in India, which helps underprivileged children. He has also taught young golfers, including Ashok Kumar, Rashid Khan and Shubham Jaglan.

External links 
 http://www.pitara.com/news-for-kids/world-news/boy-who-became-a-golfer-by-accident/
 http://www.huffingtonpost.in/2015/07/20/golf_0_n_7829960.html
 https://web.archive.org/web/20150825024431/http://www.llca.net/indexe6bc.html?page=our_people
 https://www.youtube.com/watch?v=kpoyH8YQxF8
 Tee Time with Golfer Amit Luthra, The Times of India, 25 March 2011

Indian male golfers
Asian Games medalists in golf
Asian Games gold medalists for India
Golfers at the 1982 Asian Games
Golfers at the 1994 Asian Games
Medalists at the 1982 Asian Games
Golfers from Delhi
Recipients of the Arjuna Award
1960 births
Living people